Logan Bye (born March 2, 1998) is an American ice dancer. With his skating partner and fiancée, Eva Pate, he is a two-time ISU Challenger Series silver medalist.

With former partner Chloe Lewis, he is the 2016 Youth Olympic silver medalist, 2016 JGP Estonia bronze medalist, and 2018 U.S. junior national bronze medalist.

Personal life 
Logan Bye was born on March 2, 1998, in Colorado Springs, Colorado. He moved to Portland, Oregon in 2012, and then, two years later, to Michigan. He has a younger sister named Jessica. In May 2021, he graduated from the University of Michigan in Ann Arbor, earning a Master's degree in biomedical engineering.

Bye began dating Eva Pate in December 2018 before their becoming on-ice partners. They became engaged in August 2022.

Career 
Bye started learning to skate in 2001.

Partnership with Lewis

Early years 
Bye and Chloe Lewis met in February 2010 at a rink in Sun Valley, Idaho and began training together in August 2010. Because they lived in different cities, they trained half a month together and half apart during their first two seasons. In the 2010–11 season, they qualified to compete on the intermediate level at the U.S. Junior Championships and finished sixth.

Lewis/Bye placed fourth on the novice level at the 2012 U.S. Championships. They began training together regularly after Bye moved to Beaverton, Oregon in the autumn of 2012.  They won the novice title at the 2013 U.S. Championships.

During the 2013–14 season, Lewis/Bye were coached by Ikaika Young in Portland, Oregon; by Judy Blumberg in Sun Valley, Idaho; and by Igor Shpilband in Novi, Michigan. They were invited to make their international junior debut, appearing twice on the Junior Grand Prix. They finished fifth at the 2013 JGP Mexico in Mexico City, and eleventh at the 2013 JGP Czech Republic in Ostrava. Lewis/Bye ended the season at the 2014 U.S. Junior Championships, where they came sixth.

In 2014–15, Lewis/Bye were coached by Shpilband and Blumberg in Novi, Michigan. Only given one Junior Grand Prix assignment for that season, they were fifth at the 2014 JGP France in Courchevel, and then finished seventh at the 2015 U.S. Junior Championships.

2015–16 season 
Lewis/Bye were coached solely by Shpilband going into their third international junior season. Again given two Junior Grand Prix assignments, Lewis/Bye placed fifth at both the 2015 JGP Spain and the 2015 JGP United States.

In January 2016, Lewis/Bye finished sixth at the 2016 U.S. Junior Championships. As a result of this placement, they were selected for Team USA as the lone American entry at the 2016 Winter Youth Olympics in Hamar, Norway. Ranked third in the short dance and second in the free dance, they were awarded the silver medal behind Russians Shpilevaya/Smirnov and ahead of Skoptsova/Aleshin. Bye said afterward that "being here is an honor and getting a medal it definitely inspires us quite a bit, knowing that all of our work for the season has paid off, and we’re just going to keep on working."

2016–17 season 
Beginning the season on the Junior Grand Prix, Lewis/Bye finished sixth at the 2016 JGP Czech Republic after encountering difficulties on their twizzle elements. They then competed at the 2016 JGP Estonia in Tallinn. Despite twizzle difficulties in the short dance again, they won the bronze medal.

At the 2017 U.S. Junior Championships, Lewis/Bye placed fourth and stood on the junior national podium as pewter medalists.

2017–18 season 
In their final season on the Junior Grand Prix, Lewis/Bye were fifth at both the 2017 JGP Australia and the 2017 JGP Italy.

Lewis/Bye won the bronze medal at the 2018 U.S. Junior Championships. By virtue of their top three finish, they were assigned to the American team for the 2018 World Junior Championships in Sofia. They placed seventh.

While the team had initially intended to continue and had planned programs for the following season, Lewis had begun to feel "very burnt out" with training and ultimately opted to retire from competitive skating.

Partnership with Pate

2019–20 season 
Bye had begun dating solo ice dancer Eva Pate in December 2018, and in June 2019, they decided to become an on-ice partnership, her first in competitive ice dance. They were coached by Shpilband, Pasquale Camerlengo, Adrienne Lenda and Natalia Deller in Novi.

Pate/Bye made their domestic debut at the Midwestern Sectional Dance Challenge, taking the silver medal. They went on to win the U.S. Ice Dance Final in Hyannis, Massachusetts. This, in turn, qualified them for their debut at the 2020 U.S. Championships, held in Greensboro, where they placed seventh.

2020–21 season 
Due to the onset of the COVID-19 pandemic, competition opportunities were limited both domestically and internationally for the 2020–21 season. Pate/Bye were assigned to make their Grand Prix debut at the 2020 Skate America in Las Vegas, attended primarily by American skaters due to travel restrictions pandemic. They finished in seventh place.

At the U.S. national championships later that season, also in Las Vegas, they were seventh as well.

2021–22 season 
With the resumption of a more normal international calendar, Pate/Bye made their season debut at the Lake Placid Ice Dance International, where they placed fifth. They were assigned the U.S. Classic where they earned their first international bronze medal. Pate said of the occasion that "we have been training really hard every day and just being able to be out here and put out a clean skate makes me feel really proud of us." Making their debut on the Challenger series, they were seventh at the 2021 ISU Warsaw Cup.

At the U.S. Championships, Pate/Bye finished in eighth.

2022–23 season 
The new Olympic cycle brought began with the international dance scene considerably altered from the norm, with Russian teams banned as a result of the Russo-Ukrainian War. For their program music, their rhythm dance included soundtrack music from the 2011 film Rio, which Pate had previously used in her solo dance career. Their free dance, to Riverdance, was an acknowledgement of the couple's Irish American heritage.

Pate/Bye started their season at the Lake Placid Ice Dance International, where they took the silver medal. They were given two Challenger circuit assignments after that, first winning the silver medal at the 2022 CS U.S Classic, held in Lake Placid. They set new personal bests in the process, with Bye adding that "we wanted to put out what we've been training, so I thought it went well." They went on to win a second silver medal at the 2022 CS Nepela Memorial. The team received their second ever Grand Prix assignment for the 2022 Grand Prix de France. Pate described her reaction to the news "my mom called me, and she was like, ‘You're going to France!’ and I'm like, ‘that’s crazy!’ I was so excited." They finished fifth at the event. Pate/Bye were selected to compete in a third Challenger circuit assignment, 2022 CS Golden Spin of Zagreb, where they earned a seasons best free dance score and finished fourth.

Concluding the season at the 2023 U.S. Championships, Pate/Bye finished eighth for the second consecutive year.

Programs

With Pate

With Lewis

Competitive highlights 
GP: Grand Prix; CS: Challenger Series; JGP: Junior Grand Prix

With Pate

With Lewis

Notes

References

External links 
 

1998 births
American male ice dancers
Living people
Figure skaters from Colorado Springs, Colorado
Dancers from Colorado
Figure skaters at the 2016 Winter Youth Olympics
Youth Olympic silver medalists for the United States
Michigan Wolverines athletes
21st-century American people